L'album biango is the ninth studio album by Italian rock band Elio e le Storie Tese, published in 2013.

The name is a parody of The Beatles' White Album, in which the adjective "biango" (properly "bianco", Italian for "white") is deliberately misspelled.

L'album biango has been certified gold in Italy.

Track listing
"Televisione russa" – 0:29
"Dannati forever" – 3:58
"La canzone mononota" – 4:58
"Il ritmo della sala prove" – 4:13
"Lettere dal WWW" – 0:59
"Enlarge (Your Penis)" – 3:34
"Lampo" – 4:39
"Luigi il pugilista" – 5:27
"Una sera con gli amici" – 4:37
"Amore amorissimo" – 3:56
"Il tutor di Nerone" – 5:02
"Reggia (Base per altezza)" – 2:54
"Come gli Area" – 3:45
"A Piazza San Giovanni" – 1:54
"Complesso del primo maggio [+ ghost track]" – 18:49

Charts

References

External links
 L'album biango at the Elio e le Storie Tese official website

2013 albums
Elio e le Storie Tese albums
Italian-language albums